Pāora Kīngi Delamere (1889 – 19 December 1981) was a New Zealand  carpenter, boat builder, farmer and ringatu leader. Of Māori descent, he identified with the Te Whakatōhea and Te Whānau-ā-Apanui iwi. He was born in Whitianga, East Cape, New Zealand on 1889. Monita Eru Delamere was his son.

References

1889 births
1981 deaths
New Zealand farmers
Whakatōhea people
Te Whānau-ā-Apanui people
New Zealand Ringatū clergy
People from Whitianga
New Zealand Māori farmers